Daniel Alberto Carnevali (born 4 December 1946) is a former Argentine football goalkeeper who played for the Argentina national team in the 1970s.

Club career

During his club career he played for a number of clubs, most notably Rosario Central where he won the Nacional 1980 and UD Las Palmas in Spain. His other clubs included Club Atlético Atlanta, Chacarita Juniors, Atlético Junior of Colombia and Colón de Santa Fe, where he eventually finished his career at the age of 43.

Carnevali played 425 games in the Argentine leagues and a total of over 600 games in all competitions.

International career

Carnevali was the starting goalkeeper for the Argentina national football team in the 1974 FIFA World Cup in the first 5 matches, until taken over by Ubaldo Fillol in the last match.

Honours

Club
 Rosario Central
Primera División Argentina: Nacional 1980

References

1946 births
Living people
Footballers from Rosario, Santa Fe
Association football goalkeepers
Argentine footballers
Argentina international footballers
Argentine expatriate sportspeople in Spain
1974 FIFA World Cup players
Club Atlético Atlanta footballers
Chacarita Juniors footballers
Rosario Central footballers
Club Atlético Colón footballers
UD Las Palmas players
Atlético Junior footballers